Stepney was a parliamentary constituency centred on the Stepney district of the East End of London.  It returned one Member of Parliament (MP) to the House of Commons of the Parliament of the United Kingdom, elected by the first past the post system.

History
The constituency existed for two separate periods:
 it was first created under the Redistribution of Seats Act 1885, for the 1885 general election, and abolished for the 1918 general election
 from the 1950 general election until its abolition for the February 1974 general election, when it was largely replaced by the new constituency of Stepney and Poplar.

Boundaries

The constituency was first created in 1885, as a division of the parliamentary borough of Tower Hamlets, centred on the Stepney neighbourhood in the East End of London. The area was administered as part of the Tower division of the county of Middlesex.

In 1889 there were administrative changes. The territory of the constituency was severed from Middlesex and included in the new County of London. The lower tier of local government in the area continued to be administered by parish vestries and local boards of works.

In 1900 local government in London was rationalised. The Stepney Board of Works was abolished and the civil parish of Stepney became part of a larger Metropolitan Borough of Stepney.

In the redistribution of parliamentary seats in 1918, the Metropolitan Borough was divided between three constituencies - Limehouse, Mile End and Whitechapel and St George's. The previous Stepney constituency was abolished and largely replaced by Whitechapel and St George's.

In the next major redistribution of parliamentary seats, which took effect for the 1950 United Kingdom general election, the Stepney constituency was re-created. The 1950 version of the seat comprised the whole of the Metropolitan Borough of Stepney.

In 1965 Stepney became part of the London Borough of Tower Hamlets and Greater London. When parliamentary constituencies were next redistributed, for the February 1974 general election, the area was included in the Stepney and Poplar seat.

Members of Parliament

MPs 1885–1918

MPs 1950–1974 
Constituency re-established 1950

Elections

Elections in the 1970s

Elections in the 1960s

Elections in the 1950s

Elections in the 1910s

Elections in the 1900s

Elections in the 1890s

Elections in the 1880s

 

The initial count for this election had Durant on 2,141 votes and Isaacson on 2,119 votes; a re-count then led to Durant on 2,052 votes and Isaacson on 2,051 votes. Further scrutiny then led to the above results.

References

Politics of the London Borough of Tower Hamlets
Parliamentary constituencies in London (historic)
Constituencies of the Parliament of the United Kingdom established in 1885
Constituencies of the Parliament of the United Kingdom disestablished in 1918
Constituencies of the Parliament of the United Kingdom established in 1950
Constituencies of the Parliament of the United Kingdom disestablished in 1974
Stepney